Derek Ryan (born 10 December 1969) is a retired Irish professional squash player who at the peak of his career rose to No. 7 in the world rankings, and for many years was the Irish men's number 1 player.

Ryan was born in Dublin. He began playing squash along with his brother Noel, as his parents both played. Living in Killiney he played at various local clubs including Squash Ireland and from the age of 14 he played league squash with
Sandycove TSC. Ryan was ranked first in Ireland by the age of 19.

He completed his school Leaving Certificate and decided to study accountancy which he discontinued after a year. Aged 19 he decided to play professionally and in 1991 he moved to Manchester.

After a successful international career as a professional player, including appearing a record 188 times for the Irish national team, he retired from the professional circuit in 2002. He continued to play national squash with Fitzwilliam, the current Irish champions and studied Physiotherapy at the University of Salford. Ryan now practices as a Physiotherapist in Dublin.

In 2008 he played the then current world number 2 Grégory Gaultier in his testimonial match.

Derek Ryan currently plays at Irish number 2 and has reached 200 caps for his country. He plays below Arthur Gaskin, the world number 80 and considered to be one of the greatest coaches in Britain.

References

External links
 
 
 

1969 births
Living people
Sportspeople from County Dublin
Alumni of the University of Salford
Irish physiotherapists
Irish male squash players
World Games silver medalists
Competitors at the 1997 World Games